Broudy is a surname. Notable people with the surname include:

Harry Broudy (1905–1998), Polish-born American educator
Trev Broudy (born 1968), American actor and former model

See also
Brody (name)